From the founding of the National Health Service of the United Kingdom in 1948 until the reorganisation in 1974 the hospital management committee was the main instrument of local management. There were originally 377 committees which were answerable to the 14 regional hospital boards. The 36 teaching hospitals were outside this structure and reported directly to the Minister for Health.

Hospital management committees predated the NHS as many institutions were transferred to local councils under the provisions of the Local Government Act 1929 by which boards of guardians were abolished.

Aneurin Bevan, who introduced the National Health Service in 1948, was a member of the Tredegar Cottage Hospital Management Committee around 1928 and was chairman in 1929/30.

References

Defunct National Health Service organisations
Hospitals in the United Kingdom